Lev Nikolayevich Balandin (1934–1980) was a Soviet swimmer who won two medals at the 1954 European Aquatics Championships. He also competed at the 1952 and 1956 Summer Olympics in three freestyle events, but was eliminated in prelinaries.

During his career he set four world records and seven European records in relay events. He also won 10 national titles in the 4 × 200 m freestyle (1951–1954), 4 × 100 m medley (1953–1955) and 100 m freestyle (1954–1956).

Balandin was born in Nizhny Novgorod but in the early 1950s moved to Moscow. He was married to Ida Petrovna Balandina (1931–2001) who was also a competitive swimmer.

Balandin died in 1980 in Moscow. He was buried at the Vagankovo Cemetery.

References

External links
Profile at Infosport.ru 

1934 births
1980 deaths
Russian male swimmers
Swimmers at the 1952 Summer Olympics
Swimmers at the 1956 Summer Olympics
Russian male freestyle swimmers
Soviet male swimmers
Olympic swimmers of the Soviet Union
European Aquatics Championships medalists in swimming
Sportspeople from Nizhny Novgorod
Burials at Vagankovo Cemetery